The Road–Railway Bridge or Boško Perošević Bridge was a bridge on the Danube river in Novi Sad, Serbia.

History
On 29 May 2000, one year after the NATO bombing of Yugoslavia and demolition of all three large bridges over Danube in Novi Sad, the Road–Railway Bridge was opened upstream from the Žeželj Bridge. On the proposal of Slobodan Milošević, at the time President of Yugoslavia, the bridge was named after assassinated Serbian politician and the Chairman of the Executive Council of Vojvodina Boško Perošević.

The bridge was designed to be a temporary one-lane railway and road bridge, after the demolition of nearby Žeželj Bridge during the 1999 NATO bombing of Yugoslavia.

In October 2018, following the completion of new Žeželj Bridge, dismantling of Boško Perošević Bridge began. As of March 2019, the first phase of bridge dismantling was finished.

Gallery

See also
 List of bridges in Serbia
 List of crossings of the Danube
 List of road–rail bridges

References

External links

 Road–Railway Bridge at structurae.net

Bridges in Novi Sad
Buildings and structures in Novi Sad
Bridges completed in 2000
Bridges over the Danube